Clarence Weathers (born January 10, 1962 in Greenville, South Carolina) is a former professional American football wide receiver in the National Football League. Weathers played nine seasons for the New England Patriots (1983–1984), the Cleveland Browns (1985–1988), the Indianapolis Colts (1989), the Kansas City Chiefs (1989), and the Green Bay Packers (1990–1991). His brother, Robert Weathers, also played in the NFL.

External links
New England Patriots bio

1962 births
Living people
Sportspeople from Greenville, South Carolina
Players of American football from South Carolina
American football wide receivers
Delaware State Hornets football players
New England Patriots players
Cleveland Browns players
Indianapolis Colts players
Kansas City Chiefs players
Green Bay Packers players